The 1976 Berlin Open, also known as the Berlin Grand Prix, was a men's tennis tournament staged in Berlin, West Germany that was part of the Grand Prix circuit and categorized as a One star event. The tournament was played on outdoor clay courts and was held from 14 June until 20 June 1976. It was the second edition of the tournament and unseeded Víctor Pecci won the singles title.

Finals

Singles
 Víctor Pecci defeated  Hans-Jürgen Pohmann 6–1, 6–2, 5–7, 6–3
 It was Pecci's 2nd singles title of the year and of his career.

Doubles
 Patricio Cornejo /  Antonio Muñoz defeated  Jürgen Fassbender /  Hans-Jürgen Pohmann 7–5, 6–1

References

External links
 ITF tournament edition details

Berlin Open
Berlin Open
Berlin Open, 1976
Berlin Open